Jason David Frank (September 4, 1973 – November 19, 2022) was an American actor and martial artist. He was best known for his role as Tommy Oliver in the Power Rangers television franchise.

Early life
Frank was born in Covina, California on September 4, 1973.

Career

Power Rangers
Frank was cast in the role of Tommy Oliver, the Green Ranger. The role was set for 14 episodes, but due to the popularity of the character he was brought back as the White Ranger and the new leader of the team. 

Frank was supposed to be the lead character Adam Steele in VR Troopers (originally called Cybertron) and shot a pilot episode before being called back to Power Rangers. According to both Frank and Brad Hawkins, Hawkins' character was to replace Tommy Oliver originally as the White Ranger on Power Rangers. However, due to Tommy Oliver's popularity with Power Rangers fans, Frank was brought back, with Tommy Oliver becoming the White Ranger. Hawkins would take over on VR Troopers. The character Adam Steele was renamed Ryan Steele.
After three seasons, Mighty Morphin Power Rangers transitioned into Power Rangers Zeo. The transition is part of the annual Ranger suit change to match the annual change of the Super Sentai series. Frank's character became the Red Zeo Ranger (also called Zeo Ranger V).

The following year in Power Rangers Turbo, his character became the first Red Turbo Ranger. During mid-season, Frank and fellow cast members Johnny Yong Bosch, Nakia Burrise and Catherine Sutherland agreed to leave and were replaced.

After he left the series in 1997, Frank came back to Power Rangers as the Red Zeo Ranger in 2002 for the special 10th-anniversary episode, entitled "Forever Red", in Power Rangers Wild Force, which brought back ten former Red Rangers, and reunited him with Austin St. John.

He then reprised his role in 2004 in Power Rangers Dino Thunder, as the Black Dino Ranger. During this time, Frank was always shown in long-sleeved shirts to cover the tattoos on his arms. 

This was also the case during "Forever Red" of Wild Force. Being the Black Dino Ranger was a favor to Douglas Sloan. He joked that Saban and Disney are "both the same, they're cheap" but that he was impressed with the production crew for Dino Thunder.

Frank reprised his role as Tommy Oliver (who in turn was the Green Ranger for the episode) in the season finale of Power Rangers Super Megaforce. Frank expressed interest in developing a Green Ranger solo series or feature film after an encounter with Stan Lee at a comic book convention.

Frank had a cameo role in the 2017 film Power Rangers, as a citizen of Angel Grove, alongside fellow Power Rangers actress Amy Jo Johnson. In 2018, he reprised his role as Tommy in episode 10 of Power Rangers Super Ninja Steel for the 25th anniversary of Power Rangers. In August 2022, Frank revealed that he had retired from the franchise.

Bat in the Sun: Super Power Beatdown 

On November 7, 2013, Frank appeared on Super Power Beatdown as the White Ranger taking on Scorpion from Mortal Kombat. He appeared again on May 5, 2015, as the Green Ranger and fought Ryu from Street Fighter. After success with the Super Power Beatdown series, Bat in the Sun began developing a web reality series of Frank titled My Morphing Life. In 2015, the show began airing season 2.

New Era – Legend of the White Dragon

The film Legend of the White Dragon launched on Kickstarter in 2020. Initially it was going to be a mini-series or fan film. With the popularity and excitement, it grew into a full-feature film. The film includes past Power Rangers performers such as Frank, Jason Faunt, and Ciara Hanna. Other cast members include Mark Dacascos, Michael Madsen, Andrew Byron Bachelor, and Jenna Frank. The movie wrapped in 2021. It is currently in post-production and set to release in 2023; in view of Frank's death (see below) in 2022, there has been talk of dedicating the film to his memory.

Fighting and martial arts 

With his knowledge of many different styles of martial arts that include Shōtōkan, Wadō-ryū, Taekwondo, Judo, Brazilian Jiu-Jitsu, Muay Thai, Wing Chun, Jeet Kune Do, and Aikido, Frank collected the most practical applications, modified them with his own philosophies and created his own blend of American Karate, "Toso Kune Do". On June 28, 2003, he was inducted into the World Karate Union Hall of Fame. Frank appeared at the Arnold Classic on February 29, 2008, in Columbus, Ohio.

Frank was temporarily a Guinness World Record holder in January 2013, as he successfully broke the existing record for the most 1 inch pine boards broken during freefall. The previous record was only two boards broken, but Frank attempted to break eight and successfully broke seven in his record breaking attempt. His record was eclipsed only a few months later in May 2013 by current Guinness World Record holder Ernie Torres, who broke twelve boards during his attempt.

Mixed martial arts 

On August 21, 2009, Frank officially announced his signing with SuckerPunch Entertainment, a sports marketing and management company specializing in MMA. He began training with UFC lightweight Melvin Guillard. 

Frank made his much anticipated MMA debut for the United States Amateur Combat Association at the company's first event "Lonestar Beatdown: Houston" on January 30, 2010, at the Houston Arena Theatre. He defeated Jonathon "the Mack Truck" Mack in the first round by omoplata submission. Frank fought in his second fight at Lonestar Beatdown: Dallas on February 19 in Arlington, Texas. His opponent was Chris Rose who made his ring entrance wearing a Teenage Mutant Ninja Turtles robe. Frank defeated Rose in round 1 by TKO (strikes). 

On May 8, 2010, he fought for the Texas Rage in the Cage Amateur Association "Cage Rage 7" in State Farm Arena in Hidalgo, Texas. His opponent was James Willis. Frank defeated Willis via KO in 23 seconds of the first round with a rising knee.

Frank was scheduled to make his debut with Ultimate Warrior Challenge at their upcoming event on May 22 against James "Ray" Handy Jr. in a light heavyweight bout. 

On May 21, Frank had announced on his official Facebook fan page that James Handy was injured and Carlos Horn would replace him, changing the fight to a heavyweight bout. Frank defeated Horn in the first round by an armbar submission.
Since turning pro, Frank expressed interest in signing a deal with Strikeforce and potentially fighting Herschel Walker.

Frank announced on his Facebook fan page that he would be scheduled to make his professional debut on August 4, 2010, in Houston at "Puro Combate #1." He fought at heavyweight, with his opponent being Jose Roberto Vasquez. Frank won his pro MMA debut quickly at the time of 0:46 in the first round by a Rear Naked Choke Submission.

Frank was scheduled for a Light heavyweight bout on December 9, 2010, at Puro Combate 3. The fight was canceled on December 8 due to his opponent not being medically cleared. He was then scheduled to face Shawn Machado on July 22, 2011, at Legacy FC 7. However, due to a possible biceps tear the fight was cancelled.

Personal life 

Frank began attending a Christian church after the death of his brother. He married his first wife, Shawna, in 1994, and they had three children together before divorcing in 2001. In 2003, he married his second wife, Tammie, and the couple had one daughter. In 2022, Tammie filed for divorce, though subsequently she and Frank were attempting to reconcile.

In 2017, he was targeted by a man named Matthew Sterling while attending Phoenix Comicon. Police were able to arrest Sterling before he got near Frank, after being tipped off due to social media threats made by Sterling. Sterling was later committed to 25 and a half years at the Arizona State Hospital.

Death

On November 19, 2022, Frank was found dead by suicide in a hotel in Houston, Texas. His wife Tammie, who was also staying at the hotel, subsequently explained that Frank had been struggling with depression and other mental-health issues. Several of Frank's former co-stars—including Amy Jo Johnson, Austin St. John, David Yost, and Walter Emanuel Jones—posted tributes to Frank.

Filmography

Television

Film

Video games

Mixed martial arts record

Professional

|-
| Win
|align=center|1–0
| Jose Roberto Vasquez
|Submission (rear-naked choke)
|Texas Cage Fighting – Puro Combate 1
|
|align=center|1
|align=center|0:46
|Houston, Texas, United States
|
|-

Amateur

|Win
|align=center| 1–0
| Jonathon Mack
| Submission (omoplata)
| Lonestar Beatdown: Houston
| 
|align=center| 1
|align=center| 1:07
| Houston, Texas, United States
|
|-
|Win
|align=center| 2–0
| Chris Rose
| TKO (punches)
| Lonestar Beatdown: Dallas
|
|align=center| 1
|align=center| 2:09
| Arlington, Texas, United States
|
|-
|Win
|align=center|3–0
| James Willis
| KO (knee)
| Texas Rage In The Cage: Cage Rage 7
| 
|align=center| 1
|align=center| 0:23
| McAllen, Texas, United States
|
|-
|Win
|align=center| 4–0
| Carlos Horn
| Submission (armbar)
|UWC 8: Judgement Day
| 
|align=center| 1
|align=center| 0:21
| Fairfax, Virginia, United States
|

References

External links 
 
 
 
 
 

1973 births
2022 deaths
2022 suicides
Suicides in Texas
20th-century American male actors
21st-century American male actors
American Christians
American Jeet Kune Do practitioners
American male film actors
American male karateka
American male judoka
American male mixed martial artists
American male taekwondo practitioners
American male television actors
American male video game actors
American male voice actors
American Muay Thai practitioners
American people of German descent
American people of Greek descent
American people of Irish descent
American people of Polish descent
American practitioners of Brazilian jiu-jitsu
American Wing Chun practitioners
Heavyweight mixed martial artists
Male actors from Los Angeles
Martial arts school founders
Mixed martial artists from California
Mixed martial artists utilizing Shotokan
Mixed martial artists utilizing judo
Mixed martial artists utilizing Wadō-ryū
Mixed martial artists utilizing Jeet Kune Do
Mixed martial artists utilizing Muay Thai
Mixed martial artists utilizing Wing Chun
Mixed martial artists utilizing taekwondo
Mixed martial artists utilizing Brazilian jiu-jitsu
Muay Thai trainers
People from Covina, California